Josh West (born September 19, 1976) is an American politician, and military veteran who has served in the Oklahoma House of Representatives since 2017, representing the 5th district.

Early life
West was born on September 19, 1976 in Tulsa, Oklahoma. However, he was raised in Grove, Oklahoma. In 1995, West graduated from Grove High School. He then attended Missouri Valley College on a football scholarship.

Military service
In 1996, West began training for the US Army. He graduated in 1997. During his combat service, he was deployed to multiple  locations, mainly in Afghanistan and Iraq. On October 16, 2003, West was injured in a firefight in Karbala, Iraq.
During the firefight, multiple members of his team were killed, including his battalion commander Lieutenant Colonel Kim Orlando. At the time Orlando was the highest ranked soldier to die during the Iraq War. During the fighting, West was shot in both legs and in his abdomen. He spent the next year in therapy trying to regain the use of his legs. In 2005, he was medically retired from the US Army after 9 years of service.

Oklahoma House of Representatives

2016 Primary
When incumbent Doug Cox did not seek re-election due to being term-limited, West was one of three candidates to run in the Republican Party primary. West was victorious with 60.7 percent of the vote.

2016 Election
West defeated Matt Nowlin in the Oklahoma House of Representatives District 5 general election.

56th Oklahoma Legislature (2017-2019)
During the 56th legislature, West served on the following committees:

Agriculture & Rural Development
Children, Youth & Family Services
Veterans and Military Affairs, Vice chair

2018 Primary
West was challenged by Josh Russell, Tonya Rudick and Elizabeth Boney. Nevertheless, West won with 56.5 percent of the vote.

2018 Election
West defeated challenger Ed Trumbull with 68.2 percent of the vote.

57th Oklahoma Legislature (2019-present)
During the 57th legislature, West served on the following committees:

Appropriations and Budget Committee
Rules Committee
Tourism Committee

Political positions
Most of West’s political positions are in line with that of the Oklahoma Republican Party. West opposes abortion. West is also a member of the National Rifle Association and supports gun rights. West has criticized
Barack Obama’s administration, quoting:  West also favors local control in education. West opposes Common Core, while at the same time supporting increased pay for teachers, quoting:

Personal life
West is married to his wife, Elizabeth, a United States Air Force veteran. They have 4 children.

References

1976 births
21st-century American politicians
Living people
Republican Party members of the Oklahoma House of Representatives
Missouri Valley College alumni
People from Grove, Oklahoma
Politicians from Tulsa, Oklahoma
United States Army personnel of the Iraq War
United States Army personnel of the War in Afghanistan (2001–2021)
Native American state legislators in Oklahoma